Exai is the eleventh album by electronic music duo Autechre, released on Warp Records. The double album was released in digital form on 7 February 2013, with double CD and quadruple vinyl versions released on 5 March 2013. At the time of its release, Exai was Autechre's longest album to date.

Like many other Autechre albums, Exai was followed a few months later by a companion EP entitled L-event. The tracks, all from the same sessions, were conceived of as a series of 12" vinyl records, during which L-event ultimately "became a separate entity" that the duo sees as "interchangeable" with the 12"'s that comprise Exai.

Artwork and Title
Exai (and companion EP L-event) features album artwork by The Designers Republic. Following the album's release, fan speculation included theories that the artwork was based on Conway's Game of Life or binary code. Autechre members Sean and Rob were initially reluctant to discuss the album as they "wanted to see what people could figure out," but ultimately confirmed that the artwork depicts a heavily pixelated typography exercise. Exai is Autechre's eleventh album, and the title may be derived from a phonetic rendering of the Roman numeral "XI," or eleven, which also appears in one track title: "T ess xi."

Reception

Exai has received positive reviews, with a Metacritic average rating of 80 out of 100, based on reviews from 26 critics. Grayson Currin of Pitchfork thought the album had some good moments, but was too long at two hours, and would have been improved by more editing and trimming. Chris Power of BBC Music was more enthusiastic, calling the album Autechre's best in fifteen years.

Track listing

Release history

References

External links
 Official release announcement

Autechre albums
2013 albums
Warp (record label) albums
Albums with cover art by The Designers Republic